Old Forge Airport  is a private use airport located one nautical mile (1.85 km) north of the central business district of Old Forge, a village in Herkimer County, New York, United States.

The Air Route Traffic Control Center for the airport is Boston Center, and Flight service station is the Buffalo Flight Service Station The airport is unattended and is privately owned. To land there, pilots must get permission from the owner, Adirondack Homes LLC .

Facilities 
It has one runway designated 9/27 with a turf surface measuring 3,200 by 100 feet (975 x 30 m).

References

External links 
 Aerial image as of 24 May 1998 from USGS The National Map
 

Airports in New York (state)
Transportation buildings and structures in Herkimer County, New York
Adirondacks